"Just Around the Corner" is a song by American rock band Cock Robin, released as the lead single off their second album After Here Through Midland (1987).

Composition
Written by Peter Kingsbery and produced by Don Gehman, "Just Around the Corner" lasts four minutes and 12 seconds.

Reception
Cash Box called "Just Around the Corner" "darkly ominous, brooding, yet hopeful – a brilliant cut" with a "highly original sound, with the Call and Prefab Sprout possible reference points".

The song was a hit in Europe, reaching the Top 20 in several countries, but failed to chart in the band's native country of the US.

Charts

Weekly charts

Year-end charts

References

1987 songs
1987 singles
Cock Robin (band) songs